Saint Geevarghese Mor Gregorios, popularly known as Parumala Thirumeni (Bishop of Parumala), (15 June 1848 – 2 November 1902) was a Metropolitan of  the Malankara Church. Parumala Thirumeni became the first person of Indian origin to be canonised as saint. In 1947, the Malankara Orthodox Syrian Church declared Mar Gregorios as a saint, making him the first canonized Christian saint from India.  In November 1987, the Syriac Orthodox Church canonized him as a saint.

Early life
St. Gregorios was born in Pallathetta family in the Chathuruthy house at Mulamthuruthy near Cochin, India on 15 June 1848. His parents were Mathai Gheevarghese and Mariam Gheevarghese. He was called by the name ‘Kochaippora’ and was given the baptismal name ‘Geevarghese’. Geevarghese had two brothers and two sisters; Kurian, Eli, Mariam and Varkey. Geevarghese was the youngest. Geevarghese's mother died when he was a small boy and since then he was under the loving care of his elder sister Mariam.

At a very young age, Geevarghese had shown interest in spiritual matters. His devotion, humility and above all, his ability to sing the traditional Syriac hymns beautifully and perfectly, came to the notice of his uncle Malpan Geevarghese. The uncle wanted to raise his nephew to be a priest and his family members, who knew Geevarghese's character too agreed to the Malpan's request.

Priesthood 
St. Gregorios of Parumala was taught by his uncle Geevarghese Malpan and was ordained the 9-year-old Geevarghese, a quroyo (sub-deacon) on the Feast of the Cross (Kanni 14, M.E.1033 / September 26, 1857) at the age of ten by Malankara Metropolitan Mathews Mar Athanasius at St. George Jacobite Syrian Cathedral, Karingachira. He continued his training with Malpan until the latter died from smallpox. Gregorios was also infected with smallpox but survived. He was ordained as a Mshamshono (Deacon) by Yuyakim Mor Koorilos Reesh-Episcopa of Malankara (Patriarchal Delegate of Malankara) then after one month Priest at the age of 18 in 1865 also Cor-Episcopa (Monk-Archpriest) again by Yuyakim Mor Koorilos Reesh-Episcopa of Malankara (Patriarchal Delegate of Malankara) and as a Ramban (monk-priest) at the age of 22 by Malankara Metropolitan Joseph Mar Dionysios in 1872.

On 10 December 1876, the Ignatius Peter IV Patriarch of Antioch, promoted the 28-year old Gregorios to be a bishop at St. Thomas Jacobite Syrian Church, Vadakkan Paravoor, at which point his official name became Geevarghese Mar Gregorios. He was the youngest of who all were elevated as bishops and was called Kochu Thirumeni (Young Bishop). Gregorios was given the charge of Niranam Diocese.

Metropolitan 

In his bishopric, in the Niranam Diocese, Gregorios established various churches and was the motivator to establish schools in different parts of Malankara. In the late 1890s, many educational institutions were started by the Malankara Church under the initiative and guidance of him and Joseph Mar Dionysius. Examples of these include St. Thomas School at Mulanthuruthy, St. Ignatius School at Kunnamkulam, and the Syrian English School (now known as MGM High School) at Thiruvalla.

Following the death of fellow metropolitans (bishops), the administration of Thumpamon and Kollam dioceses also passed to him. In 1887, the first block of the Parumala Seminary was consecrated.

By 1895, Gregorios had made Parumala his main spiritual centre. The church that he founded there in that year was consecrated in the names of St. Peter and St. Paul. He would wake at 4 am to pray the Shehimo prayers and he fasted on Wednesday and Fridays, as well as during Lent.

Geevarghese visited Jerusalem in 1895. He visited almost all the important places of Christendom and led the Passion Week services at Syrian Orthodox Church in the Holy City with accompanied members Geevarghese Dionysius of Vattasseril, Kochuparambil Paulose Koorilos and Sleeba Osthathios (Later Patriarchal Delegate of Malankara) led as guide. On his return, he collected a certain amount from all the Parishes in Malankara and sent a Silver Cross as offering to the Holy church in Jerusalem.

Disciples 
Among the many disciples of Gregorios, four deserve special notice

1. Vattasseril Geevarghese (later, Malankara Metropolitan Geevarghese Dionysius of Vattasseril) ( served as the Private Secretary of Mar Gregorios of Parumala)

2. Panampady Paulose (later, Koorilos Paulose).

2. Kuttikattu Paulose (later, Paulose Athanasios)

3. Kallasseril Geevarghese (later, Catholicos of Malankara Church and Malankara Metropolitan Baselios Geevarghese II)

Death 
Gregorios already had stomach ulcer and it became chronic in 1902. Treatments proved futile and he grew weaker and weaker. On 2 November 1902, Gregorios had left for his heavenly abode. The funeral was conducted at Saint Peter's and Saint Paul's Syian Orthodox  Church, Parumala on 3 November 1902. Thousands of people and hundreds of priests were present at the funeral gave testimonies of the saintly Gregorios. The mausoleum which Gregorios was interred became a popular pilgrimage site.

Canonization

In Malankara Orthodox Church
On the occasion of 45th death anniversary of Geevarghese Mar Gregorios, based on the decision of the episcopal synod held in 1947, Baselios Geevarghese II, Catholicos of the East and Malankara Metropolitan declared Mar Gregorios as a saint for the Malankara Syrian Church on 2 November 1947.

In Jacobite Syrian Christian Church (Syrian Orthodox)
According to the recommendation of the local synod of Church in India, held on 22 August 1987 Ignatius Zakka I, Patriarch of Antioch, head of Syriac Orthodox Church declared Mar Gregorios as canonized saint for Jacobite Syrian Christian Church on 20 October 1987.

Minor Shrines
Mulanthuruthy Church - St. Thomas Church, Mulanthuruthy is the most major shrine of Parumala Mor Gregorios known as the baptized church. 
St. George's Monastery, Malekurish - a pilgrimage site of the Jacobite Syrian Christian Church, situated on the hilltop near Puthencruz. One of the relics of saints installed on Malecruz Dayara is of Parumala Mar Gregorios.
Perumpilly Simhasana Church - The Perumpilly Simhasana Church is situated in the native place of Geevargese Mar Gregorios. He leaves this church for a long time.

References

External links

About thirumeni on the Official site of Malankara Church
Parumala Thirumeni
Official Site for Parumala Church

Indian Christian saints
Malankara Orthodox Syrian Church saints
1848 births
1902 deaths
19th-century Oriental Orthodox bishops
People from Ernakulam district
Malankara Orthodox Syrian Church bishops
Saint Thomas Christians
Malankara Orthodox Syrian Church
Malankara Orthodox Syrian Church Christians